A personal account is an account for use by an individual for that person's own needs. It is a relative term to differentiate them from those accounts for business or  corporate use.

References 

Bank account